Jim Grabb and Richey Reneberg were the defending champions, but lost in the final this year.

Todd Woodbridge and Mark Woodforde won the title, defeating Grabb and Reneberg 7–6, 6–4 in the final.

Seeds
All seeds receive a bye into the second round.

Draw

Finals

Top half

Bottom half

References
Draw

Tennis tournaments in Japan
1992 ATP Tour
Tokyo Indoor